HMS Tynedale  was a  of the first subgroup which served during the Second World War.

Construction
Tynedale was ordered from Alexander Stephen and Sons on 11 April 1939 as part of the 1939 Program and laid down on 27 July 1939 under yard number  J1471. She was launched on 5 June 1940 and commissioned on 2 December 1940. She was adopted by the civil community of Hexham, Northumberland following a Warship Week savings campaign in February 1942.

Service and loss

Tynedale was mostly employed on convoy and escort duties initially as part of the First Destroyer Flotilla based at Portsmouth. On 11 March 1941 she sustained damage which put her out of action for 9 days from an air raid of Portsmouth's docks by the Luftwaffe.
On 15 December, she was transferred to the 15th Flotilla based at Plymouth.

Tynedale took part in the St. Nazaire Raid on 27 March 1942 as one of the escorts for the destroyer  and small craft which were to enter the harbour. South west of Ushant she sighted the U-boat U-593 and attacked her initially with depth charges and then, when the submarine was forced to the surface, with a deck gun. However the submarine managed to dive again and escaped. It would be the same submarine U-593 which would sink Tynedale the following year. When rendezvousing with the surviving small craft from the raid outside the harbour Tynedale and another destroyer, 
engaged the five German torpedo boats of the 5th Flotilla.

Tynedale returned to Plymouth on 29 March, along with the rest of the convoy that had survived. She underwent repairs and resumed duties on 18 April, continuing with convoy escorts in the Southwest Approaches. On 14 May, she encountered the German auxiliary cruiser , and was part of the task force that sank it, albeit only as a support vessel. She also participated in a support role in the sinking of the German auxiliary cruiser  in October.

1943
Tynedale was nominated for service in the Mediterranean, and as part of Destroyer Division 59 (which she joined on 8 March 1943) she guarded convoys between Gibraltar and Algeria. She acted as an interceptor during the Allied invasion of Sicily, and aided in the rescuing of 218 passengers from the Dutch freighter Felix Jan Van Manix which was torpedoed and sank in October.

During convoy escorts with convoy KMS34 on 12 December 1943, Tynedale was torpedoed off Jijel, Algeria, by   commanded by Kptlt. Gerd Kelbling, the same boat which it had damaged at St. Nazaire. The ship broke in two, and despite rescue efforts by other ships, 73 crewmen died (seven officers and 63 men). U-593 later sank another Hunt-class destroyer,  before surfacing and surrendering on 13 December.

See also
 Tynedale

References

Publications

External links
 Profile on naval-history.net
 BBC People's War
 Uboat.net profile

 

Hunt-class destroyers of the Royal Navy
Ships built in Govan
1940 ships
World War II destroyers of the United Kingdom
World War II shipwrecks in the Mediterranean Sea
Maritime incidents in December 1943
Ships sunk by German submarines in World War II